Jeanne Robinson (March 30, 1948 – May 30, 2010) was an American-born Canadian choreographer who co-wrote three science fiction novels, The Stardance Saga, with her husband Spider Robinson. Stardance won the Hugo Award for Best Novella in 1978.

Biography 
Jeanne Robinson was born in Boston, Massachusetts. She studied dance at the Boston Conservatory, and at the Martha Graham, Alvin Ailey, and Erick Hawkins schools. She performed with the Beverly Brown Dance Ensemble in New York City, and served as the artistic director of the Nova Dance Theatre in Halifax, Nova Scotia, where she choreographed more than thirty original works.

Robinson married fellow science-fiction writer Spider Robinson in 1975. She was diagnosed with biliary tract cancer in February 2009 and began undergoing numerous treatments. She died, age 62, on May 30, 2010.

Along with her husband, she was awarded the Inkpot Award in 2001.

See also

References

External links 
 
 Stardance official movie website (archived 13 January 2016)
 Stardance movie blog
 Team Robinson
 

Place of death missing
1948 births
2010 deaths
20th-century Canadian novelists
20th-century American educators
20th-century Canadian women writers
21st-century Canadian novelists
21st-century Canadian women writers
21st-century educators
American expatriate writers in Canada
Artistic directors
Boston Conservatory at Berklee alumni
Canadian choreographers
Canadian educators
Canadian female dancers
Canadian science fiction writers
Canadian women novelists
Deaths from cancer in Nova Scotia
Dance teachers
Deaths from bladder cancer
Educators from Massachusetts
Educators from New York City
Hugo Award-winning writers
Nebula Award winners
Women science fiction and fantasy writers
Writers from Boston
Writers from New York City
Writers from Halifax, Nova Scotia
20th-century American women educators
21st-century American women educators
21st-century American educators
Canadian women choreographers
Inkpot Award winners